Schricker House may refer to:

John Schricker House, listed on the National Register of Historic Places in Davenport, Iowa
John C. Schricker House, listed on the National Register of Historic Places in Davenport, Iowa
Selma Schricker House,  contributing property in the Riverview Terrace Historic District.